Paul Tobin may refer to:
 Paul Tobin (Medal of Honor), United States Navy sailor and Medal of Honor recipient
 Paul E. Tobin Jr. (born c. 1941), United States Navy officer
 Paul Tobin (author), American comic writer 
 Paul Tobin (basketball) (1909–2003), American basketball player